Juho Pietari "Hannes" Kolehmainen (9 December 1889 – 11 January 1966) was a Finnish four-time Olympic Gold medalist and a world record holder in middle- and long-distance running. He was the first in a generation of great Finnish long-distance runners, often named the "Flying Finns". Kolehmainen competed for a number of years in the United States, wearing the Winged Fist of the Irish American Athletic Club. He also enlisted in the 14th Regiment of the National Guard of New York, and became a U.S. citizen in 1921.

Biography
Kolehmainen, a devoted vegetarian and bricklayer by trade, was from a sportive family from Kuopio – his brothers William and Tatu were also strong long-distance runners. Tatu competed in two Olympics and finished 10th in the Marathon in 1920. Hannes was one of the stars of the 1912 Summer Olympics in Stockholm, winning three gold medals. His most memorable was the one in the 5000 m. In that event, he ran a heroic duel with Frenchman Jean Bouin. After leading the field together for most of the race, Bouin was only defeated by Kolehmainen in the final metres, in world record time. In addition, Kolehmainen won the 10,000 m and the now-discontinued cross country event. With the Finnish team, he also obtained a silver place in the cross country team event.

Kolehmainen's sportive career was interrupted by the First World War, but he remained an athlete to be reckoned with, although his specialty had now shifted to the longer distances, especially the marathon. At the first post-war Olympics in Antwerp, he won the gold medal in this event. He would also enter the Olympic marathon in 1924, but did not complete that race.

By then, Kolehmainen had found a worthy successor in Paavo Nurmi. Together with Nurmi, as the final link in the torch relay, he lit the Olympic Flame at the 1952 Summer Olympics in Helsinki. He died in that same city, fourteen years later.

References

External links
 
 
 
 

 
 

1889 births
1966 deaths
People from Kuopio
People from Kuopio Province (Grand Duchy of Finland)
Finnish male long-distance runners
Finnish male marathon runners
Olympic athletes of Finland
Athletes (track and field) at the 1912 Summer Olympics
Athletes (track and field) at the 1920 Summer Olympics
Athletes (track and field) at the 1924 Summer Olympics
Olympic gold medalists for Finland
Olympic silver medalists for Finland
World record setters in athletics (track and field)
Olympic cauldron lighters
Bricklayers
Medalists at the 1920 Summer Olympics
Medalists at the 1912 Summer Olympics
Olympic gold medalists in athletics (track and field)
Olympic silver medalists in athletics (track and field)
Olympic cross country runners
Sportspeople from North Savo